Riho Sayashi (鞘師里保 Sayashi Riho; born May 28, 1998 in Hiroshima, Japan) is a Japanese dancer, actress, and singer. She is a former ninth generation member of the Japanese pop group Morning Musume, along with Mizuki Fukumura, Erina Ikuta, and Kanon Suzuki, as well as a former member of the duo Peaberry. Her uncle, Tomoya Sayashi, is a former Japanese baseball player of the Hiroshima Toyo Carp of Japan's Central League. In 2019, she became a touring member of Babymetal, including in their performance at Glastonbury Festival 2019.

Biography

Prior to joining Morning Musume, Sayashi was a student of Actor's School Hiroshima (ASH) whose graduates include Suzuka Nakamoto, Himeka Nakamoto, Perfume, and Ruru Dambara.

2010: Early career

Sayashi was one of the winners of the Jc&Jk actress audition and got a chance to perform in Morning Musume's Fashionable stage play.

2011–2015: Morning Musume

Sayashi passed Morning Musume's ninth generation auditions, along with Erina Ikuta, Kanon Suzuki, and former Hello! Pro Egg Mizuki Fukumura. The ninth generation members debuted in Morning Musume January 2, at the Hello! Project 2011 WINTER ~Kangei Shinsen Matsuri~ concert. Sayashi's first single with Morning Musume is titled "Maji Desu ka Ska!".

On March 27, 2011, it was announced Sayashi would be replacing Erina Mano for the radio show Mano Deli, renaming it Riho Deli. Sayashi was the only ninth generation member to receive solo lines in "Only You". On July 29, 2011 Sayashi was out of events for a few weeks to rest due to ischium nerve pain on her right side.

In July 2012, it was announced that Sayashi will be part of the new Hello! Project duo Peaberry, along with S/mileage's Ayaka Wada, and that they would perform their original song "Cabbage Hakusho" at the Hello! Project summer concerts. They were formed alongside the group DIY♡ to be part of Hello! SATOYAMA Life.

On October 29, 2015, it was announced that Sayashi will graduate from Morning Musume '15 on December 31, 2015 during the annual Hello! Project Countdown Live. On December 29, 2015, Morning Musume '15 released their 60th single; this was the last Morning Musume single to feature Sayashi.

On December 31, 2015, Sayashi graduated from Morning Musume and became an artist under Hello! Project.

2016–2018: Studying abroad 
After leaving Morning Musume, Sayashi went to New York and other places abroad for about two years to study dancing and English.

On December 7, 2018, it was that announced her contract with UP-FRONT PROMOTION had ended and she subsequently graduated from Hello! Project at the end of November 2018.

2019: Morning Musume reunion, touring with Babymetal 
After a 3 year and 3 month hiatus, Sayashi re-appeared to the public at Hello! Project 20th Anniversary!! Hello! Project Hina Fes 2019 on March 30. She made a guest appearance at the event and performed with several current and former Morning Musume members.

On June 28, Sayashi appeared as a support dancer, or "Avenger", for the kawaii metal group Babymetal on the "Babymetal Awakens -The Sun Also Rises-" concert in Yokohama Arena. Two days later on June 30, she also appeared with them at the prestigious Glastonbury Festival in the same capacity, as they became the first Japanese band to perform on a main stage at the festival.

2020–present: Solo career 
On May 1, 2020, Sayashi started an Instagram account, where she posts in Japanese and English.

Since July 10, Sayashi has her own column called  in the online magazine NewsCrunch, published by Wani Books.

On July 14, 2021, Sayashi's staff announced the sale of her first EP, named DAYBREAK, which was released at August 4, under her newly established label "Savo-r", and also held a one-man live tour titled "RIHO SAYASHI 1st LIVE 2021 DAYBREAK" at Toyosu PIT, Tokyo Team Smile. This album was her first newly made material after five and half years, after her graduation from Morning Musume in 2015.  Sayashi wrote the lyrics for all the songs on the album, and worked together with several composers.

Hello! Project groups and units
 Morning Musume (2011–2015)
 Hello! Project Mobekimasu (2011)
 Peaberry (2012–2015)

Discography

Singles
 Morning Musume
 "Maji Desu ka Ska!"
 "Only You"
 "Kono Chikyū no Heiwa o Honki de Negatterun Da yo! / Kare to Issho ni Omise ga Shitai!"
 "Pyoco Pyoco Ultra"
 "Ren'ai Hunter"
 "One Two Three / The Matenrō Show"
 "Wakuteka Take a Chance"
 "Help Me!!"
 "Brainstorming / Kimi Sae Ireba Nani mo Iranai"
 "Wagamama Ki no Mama Ai no Joke / Ai no Gundan"
 "Egao no Kimi wa Taiyō sa / Kimi no Kawari wa Iyashinai / What is Love?" 
 "Toki o Koe Sora o Koe / Password is 0"
 "Tiki Bun / Shabadaba Dū / Mikaeri Bijin"
 "Seishun Kozo ga Naiteiru / Yūgure wa Ameagari / Ima Koko Kara"
 "Oh My Wish! / Sukatto My Heart / Ima Sugu Tobikomu Yūki"
 "Tsumetai Kaze to Kataomoi / Endless Sky / One and Only"

 Reborn Eleven
 "Reborn ~Inochi no Audition~" 

 Hello! Project Mobekimasu
 "Busu ni Naranai Tetsugaku" 

 Peaberry
"Cabbage Hakusho ~Haru Hen~"

EPs

DVDs

Blu-rays

Bibliography

Photobooks
  (August 27, 2011, Wani Books)
  (August 27, 2012, Wani Books)
  (November 25, 2013, Wani Books)
  (March 25, 2015, Wani Books)

Appearances

Film
  (2011)

Drama
  (2012)
 Don't Stop My Beautification, Masumi Haraguchi (2023)

Television
  (2011)
  (April 2011 – May 2012)
  (June 2012 – 2014)
 , English Communication I host (2022)

Theater
  (2010)
  (2011)
"Lilium: Girls' Purity Musical"(2014)

Radio
 Riho Deli (2011–2015)

Internet
 UstreaMusume (2011–201(?))

References

External links
 Official Hello! Project Profile
 Ustreamusume Link

1998 births
Living people
People from Hiroshima
21st-century Japanese actresses
Japanese dancers
Japanese female dancers
Japanese female idols
Japanese women pop singers
Japanese child singers
Morning Musume members
Musicians from Hiroshima Prefecture